California Jamming is a live album by British hard rock band Deep Purple, recorded in 1974 and originally released in 1996, it was re-released as a remastered edition in 2003 with the complete concert including the missing track "Lay Down, Stay Down".

The album is a live recording of Deep Purple's infamous appearance at the California Jam Festival on 6 April 1974, which was televised by ABC-TV in prime time. 
It was one of the first to feature their third line-up, which included vocalist David Coverdale and bassist/vocalist Glenn Hughes. At the end of the show, guitarist Ritchie Blackmore first attacked one of the network's video cameras (which had been getting between him and the audience) with his guitar, and then had his amplifiers doused with gasoline and set on fire, which caused an explosion.

Most of this concert was broadcast over 4 weekends in April 1974 on KLOS-FM ABC-TV Stereo Simulcast, along with other California Jam artists.

Releases
Deep Purple's performance at the California Jam has been available over the years in several different releases with various names, among them: "California Jamming", Live at the Ontario Speedway '74, Live at the California Jam and finally California Jam 1974 (not counting successive re-releases, mostly Japanese). While all of these releases are culled from the same performance, most of them don't feature the full show, with edits and most importantly, missing a full song: "Lay Down, Stay Down."

The first release of this concert was on videotape and Laserdisc in 1981, under the title California Jam in Japan and the UK. See Live in California 74

Track listing

Personnel
Deep Purple
Ritchie Blackmore – lead guitar
Jon Lord – organ, synthesizer
Ian Paice – drums
David Coverdale – lead vocals
Glenn Hughes – bass, vocals

References

1974 live albums
Deep Purple live albums
Purple Records live albums